The South Bay, also known as South County, is a region in southwestern San Diego County, California consisting of the cities and unincorporated communities of Bonita, Chula Vista, East Otay Mesa, Imperial Beach, Lincoln Acres, National City, and South San Diego.

Defined by its proximity to San Diego Bay and the Mexico-United States border, the South Bay is a mix of heavy industrial complexes and shipyards alongside beaches and residential developments. One of its cities, Imperial Beach, bills itself as "Classic Southern California" for being relatively untouched in terms of other coastal cities.

History
The area encompassing the South Bay was originally inhabited by the Kumeyaay peoples. Under Mexican rule, several Mexican land grants were established in the region, including Rancho Janal, Rancho Otay, and Rancho de la Nación. In the 1870s, South Bay Salt Works began operations. National City was incorporated in 1887, Chula Vista in 1911, and Imperial Beach in 1956. South San Diego, including the communities of San Ysidro, Nestor, Palm City, and Otay Mesa, was annexed by the City of San Diego in 1957.

The term "South Bay" has referred to the region since at least the early 20th century, with one reference dating from 1918.

In October 2007, South Bay was quickly encroached upon by the Harris Fire, part of a series of fires that ravaged California in the 2007 Fire season.

Traditionally more residential and calmer than North County, in 2010 regional cities were taking on projects that included the development of luxury resorts in efforts to revitalize the South Bay. On May 18, 2010, further development of the Chula Vista Bayfront was authorized by the Unified Port of San Diego and City of Chula Vista. Plans included marina expansion, luxury resort development, and the addition of a conference center. Additionally, in Imperial Beach, on September 29, 2010 the Seacoast Inn was demolished to make room for a $20 million resort.

Geography

South Bay borders both San Diego Bay and the Pacific Ocean. The region is at the southern end of the bay and western slope of the coastal mountains to the east. There are a few creeks that make their way from these mountains with their terminus in either the southern end of the bay, the ocean, or the Tijuana River estuary. Its boundaries are the San Diego Bay on the west, the United States–Mexico border on the south, National City's border with northern San Diego and Coronado to the north, and the unincorporated communities and Otay Lakes to the east.

Ecology
Nature preserve areas in South Bay include San Diego Bay National Wildlife Refuge, Otay Mountain Wilderness, Tijuana Slough National Wildlife Refuge and Tijuana River National Estuarine Research Reserve. The Tijuana River Estuary is located on the southern coast of South Bay. The river which feeds it has a watershed that drains from both Tijuana Municipality and San Diego County. There have been problems with the cleanliness of the estuary, from the Tijuana part of the watershed, which has led to constructive measures with efforts to clean the water. Located within the Tijuana River National Estuarine Reserve, the Tijuana River estuary is the largest wetland in Southern California. The wetland supports over 370 species of migratory and year-round dwelling waterfowl.

Demographics
The population was 462,843 , an 18.3% increase from 2000. South Bay is the third-largest region of Greater San Diego in population, ahead of East County and behind North County.

The South Bay is known for its relatively large immigrant population, with many first-generation Mexican-Americans and Filipino-Americans. 26% of San Diego County's Hispanic population, the vast majority of which is of Mexican origin, lives in the South Bay. , descendants of the early explorers of Alta California continue to live in the South Bay.

As of 2010, South San Diego, National City and Chula Vista have Hispanic majorities, while Imperial Beach has a Hispanic plurality and Bonita has a non-Hispanic white plurality.

Communities
Populations are as of the 2020 census with the exception of South San Diego.

Incorporated cities
Chula Vista - 275,487
South San Diego, San Diego - 107,631 (2010)
National City - 56,173
Imperial Beach - 26,137

Census-designated place
Bonita - 12,917

Other unincorporated communities
 East Otay Mesa
 Lincoln Acres

Federal military reservations
Naval Base San Diego, San Diego
Naval Outlying Landing Field Imperial Beach, Imperial Beach
Silver Strand Training Complex, Coronado

Education

Primary and secondary schools
South Bay is served by the Sweetwater Union High School District, Chula Vista Elementary School District, National School District, San Ysidro School District, and the South Bay Union School District. There are approximately fourteen high schools, fourteen middle schools, and numerous elementary schools. The South Bay area is also served by charter and private schools.

Colleges and universities
Located in Chula Vista is Southwestern College, a two-year community college and feeder school to University of California, San Diego and San Diego State University.

Government
The South County Regional Center contains the South Bay Courthouse of the San Diego Superior Court as well as offices for the San Diego County Sheriff, the San Diego District Attorney, the San Diego County Board of Supervisors, and others. The center is located in downtown Chula Vista.

Media

Newspapers
South Bay is served by the San Diego Union-Tribune, whose website features a "South County" section that is largely congruent with South Bay, although the "South County" section includes Coronado. South Bay also receives coverage from the weekly San Diego Reader.

Chula Vista, National City, and Bonita are served by the weekly newspaper The Star-News, which was formed in 1954 upon the merger of the Chula Vista Star with the National City News. Imperial Beach is served by the weekly Imperial Beach and South County Eagle & Times.

San Ysidro was once served by the weekly San Ysidro Border Press.

Radio
No radio station is licensed to any city in the South Bay area. The area is instead served by stations licensed to the Baja California municipalities of Tijuana and Tecate, all of which effectively cover the area. However, XHLTN-FM maintains a sales office in Chula Vista, and XHGLX-FM had a similar setup in National City, both stations sending data to cross-border control rooms. The area is also served by other San Diego area radio stations. During tropospheric ducting, the signals of out of market stations KYSR, KBIG, KRTH, and KRUZ can reach the area, while sensitive radio tuners have picked up KIIS-FM on occasion.

Television
Terrestrial digital television stations KNSD and KUSI-TV have their transmitters on Mount San Miguel. The area is also served by XETV and XHDTV. The selection of local stations on cable and satellite services vary by provider.

Landmarks
Important landmarks in South Bay include: 
 San Ysidro Port of Entry (Mexico-U.S. border crossing at San Ysidro)
 Border Field State Park (includes Friendship Park)
 The Tijuana River Estuary and Tijuana River National Estuarine Research Reserve
 The Chula Vista Bayfront
 North Island Credit Union Amphitheatre
 Imperial Beach Pier
 Onstage Playhouse
 The National City Depot
 Sweetwater Dam 
 Surfhenge.

Politics
South Bay is located entirely within Supervisorial District 1 at the county level, which as of January 2021, will be represented by Democrat Nora Vargas, who will succeed outgoing supervisor Greg Cox.

See also
 North County
 East County
Otay River
Sweetwater River

References

External links

 City of Chula Vista
 City of National City
 City of Imperial Beach
 City of Coronado

 

San Diego Bay
.
Regions of California